The 2022 Asian Track Cycling Championships (41st edition) took place at the Indira Gandhi Stadium Velodrome in New Delhi, India from 18 to 22 June 2022.

Medal summary

Men

Women

Medal table

References

External links
Official website 

Asian Cycling Championships
Asia
Cycling
International cycle races hosted by India
Asian Track Cycling Championships